An election was held on November 4, 2008 to elect all 100 members to Montana's House of Representatives. The election coincided with elections for other offices, including U.S. President, U.S. Senate, U.S. House of Representatives, Governor and State Senate. The primary election was held on June 3, 2008.

A net gain of one seat by the Democrats resulted in the House being tied at 50 seats each. Democrats regained control of the House after two years by virtue of Governor Brian Schweitzer being a Democrat.

Results

Statewide
Statewide results of the 2008 Montana House of Representatives election:

District
Results of the 2008 Montana House of Representatives election by district:

References

House of Representatives
Montana House of Representatives
2008